Alvin Paul Wegeman (March 1, 1927 – May 30, 2015) was an American nordic combined skier. While on leave from the U.S. Navy, he competed in the Nordic combined event at the 1952 Winter Olympics, but fell on his third jump did not finish, and was hospitalized with a concussion. Wegeman also competed for the U.S. at the 1950 World Championships in Lake Placid, New York.

A native of Colorado, Wegeman attended the University of Denver and worked as a ski instructor in the Vail area. He later played a key role in instructing future American Winter Olympic athletes by developing the Steamboat Springs area, which would develop more Olympic athletes in Colorado.

Wegeman was inducted into the Colorado Ski and Snowboard Hall of Fame in 1998. His late brother Keith was inducted into that Hall of Fame in 1989. Wegeman also has a niece, Katherine Kelly Lang, known for her portrayal of Brooke Logan on the American soap opera, The Bold and the Beautiful since 1987.

He was the first husband of alpine ski racer Katy Rodolph. They wed in 1951, but kept it secret for a year. They divorced and she remarried in 1956.

References

External links

Colorado Ski and Snowboard Hall of Fame – Paul  Wegeman

1927 births
American male Nordic combined skiers
Olympic Nordic combined skiers of the United States
Nordic combined skiers at the 1952 Winter Olympics
Sportspeople from Colorado
University of Denver alumni
2015 deaths
United States Navy officers
United States Naval Aviators